Fernandocrambus cuprescens is a moth in the family Crambidae. It was described by George Hampson in 1919. It is found in Chile.

References

Crambini
Moths described in 1919
Moths of South America
Endemic fauna of Chile